Muhammad Aqhari bin Abdullah (born 9 July 1991) is a retired  Singaporean professional footballer who last played as a right back for the Singapore Premier League side Tanjong Pagar United and the Singapore national football team.

Club career

Aqhari began his football career with Balestier Khalsa in the S.League in 2010 before making moves to Hougang United in 2011 and Young Lions in 2012.

In January 2013, he was named in the LionsXII squad for the 2013 Malaysia Super League.

Lion City Sailors 
On 1 November 2021, it was announced by Lion City Sailors that Aqhari will not continue with the team next season.

Tanjong Pagar United 
On 23 January 2022, Aqhari signed for Tanjong Pagar United for the 2022 season.

International career
Aqhari was first called up to the national senior team for the friendly against France U21 on 2 June 2014.

Personal life

Aqhari's father is former Singapore international and ex-Balestier Khalsa head coach Abdullah Noor.

He graduated from the Singapore Sports School in 2008.

Career statistics

Club

 Young Lions and LionsXII are ineligible for qualification to AFC competitions in their respective leagues.
 Young Lions withdrew from the 2012 Singapore Cup due to participation in the 2013 AFC U-22 Championship qualifiers.

Honours

Club

LionsXII 
Malaysia Super League: 2013

Lion City Sailors 
 Singapore Premier League: 2021

References

1991 births
Living people
Singaporean footballers
Balestier Khalsa FC players
Hougang United FC players
Singapore Premier League players
LionsXII players
Singaporean people of Malay descent
Association football midfielders
Malaysia Super League players
Young Lions FC players
Lion City Sailors FC players